Shimon Avimor born Erich S. Schwarz, was an Israeli diplomat and author. Avimor was the Israeli Ambassador to Cambodia, Laos (non-resident, Phnom Penh 1972 – 1975), Gabon.

On 28 December 1972, Avimor was one of four Israeli officials who were taken hostage at the Israeli Embassy in Bangkok. He was also the Consul General to Monaco and Head of the Mission (1976–1979).

Publications
Relations Between Israel and Asian and African States: Côte d'Ivoire Written with Hanan Aynor Hebrew University of Jerusalem, Harry S. Truman Research Institute for the Advancement of Peace, Leonard Davis Institute for International Relations, 1986
 Contemporary History of Cambodia (1949–1975) Under an Israeli Perspective (French Text). 1982

References

External links
German wiki article

Ambassadors of Israel to Gabon
Ambassadors of Israel to Laos
Ambassadors of Israel to Cambodia
Ambassadors of Israel to Monaco
Israeli consuls
Israeli male writers
Israeli non-fiction writers
Male non-fiction writers